Liptougou is a department or commune of Gnagna Province in northern Burkina Faso. Its capital lies at the town of Liptougou.

Towns and villages

References

Departments of Burkina Faso
Gnagna Province